Hope station is a railway station in Hope, British Columbia, Canada, located along CN railway tracks. The station is served by Via Rail's The Canadian as a flag stop (48-hour advance notice required). 

The station is only served by westbound trains towards Vancouver. Eastbound trains call at Katz railway station along the CPR tracks, on the other side of the Fraser River. This split in service between Vancouver and Ashcroft is due to CN and CPR utilizing directional running through the Thompson- and Fraser Canyon.

The station was built by the Canadian Northern Railway in 1916, one of three nearly identical designs by CNoR architect John Schofield.  The other two stations, since demolished, were located in Chilliwack BC, and Estevan, SK. The station was moved in the 1980s to the business road and intersection after CN divested itself of passenger services.  Again this station faces demolition early in 2021.

Footnotes

External links 
Via Rail Station Description

Via Rail stations in British Columbia